Junior Osvaldo Lake (born March 27, 1990) is a Dominican professional baseball outfielder for the Toros de Tijuana of the Mexican League. He signed as an international free agent with the Chicago Cubs in 2007 and made his Major League Baseball (MLB) debut with them in 2013. He has also played for the Baltimore Orioles and Toronto Blue Jays.

Professional career

Chicago Cubs
On February 13, 2007, he was signed as an international free agent. He started playing for the DSL Cubs at the age of 17 batting .274 with 3 home runs. He then played for the Arizona League Cubs batting .286 with 2 home runs. In 2009, he went to the Peoria Chiefs batting .248 with 7 home runs. Lake was added to the Cubs 40-man roster on November 18, 2011.

Lake suffered a stress fracture in a rib in spring training in 2013. He began the season in the minors. The Cubs promoted him to the major leagues on July 19 after Brian Bogusevic was injured and he was batting .295.  Lake went 3-for-4 with a double and a stolen base in his debut. In his first seven games, Lake had 15 hits, tied for the third most by any major league player since 1900. He batted .484 with 2 home runs and 5 runs batted in over this stretch. With the return of  David DeJesus on July 24 and the departure of Alfonso Soriano, Lake assumed the starting role of left field. On August 1, 2013, Lake had the first multi-homer game of his career when he hit two solo home runs in a 6-4 loss to the Los Angeles Dodgers at Wrigley Field.  On September 6, 2013, he hit the first grand slam of his career in the first inning off Kyle Lohse of the Milwaukee Brewers. Lake finished the 2013 campaign batting .284 in 64 games with 6 homers, 16 RBIs, and 4 stolen bases.

Lake started at left field on Opening Day in 2014. He hit his 7th and 8th home runs of the season in a game against the Miami Marlins on June 7, it was his second career multi-homerun game. After hitting just .216 with 9 home runs for the Cubs in 2014, Lake was optioned back to the Triple-A Iowa Cubs on August 16.

Lake spent the majority of the 2015 season in Triple-A for the Cubs. He was called up and played in 21 games for the Cubs due to numerous injuries in the outfield.

Baltimore Orioles
On July 31, 2015, Lake was traded to the Baltimore Orioles for Tommy Hunter. Lake appeared in 8 games for the Orioles, batting .136. On December 10, Lake was designated for assignment.

Toronto Blue Jays
On December 18, 2015, Lake was claimed off waivers by the Toronto Blue Jays. Lake was added to their active roster on June 24, 2016. He was designated for assignment on July 25 after José Bautista returned from the disabled list. He cleared waivers, and was outrighted to the Triple-A Buffalo Bisons on July 31. Lake was brought up to the Blue Jays on August 10 when Bautista was once again placed on the disabled list. On August 16, Lake was designated for assignment after the Blue Jays activated Ezequiel Carrera. Lake played in 22 games for the Blue Jays in 2016, hitting .200 with one home run and two RBI.

Boston Red Sox
On December 9, 2016, Lake signed a minor league contract with the Boston Red Sox. He was released on May 1, 2017.

Bravos de León
On June 20, 2017, Lake signed with the Bravos de León of the Mexican League.

Seattle Mariners
On February 14, 2018, Lake signed a minor league deal with the Seattle Mariners. He was released on March 28, 2018.

Return to León
On April 7, 2018, Lake re-signed with the Bravos de León of the Mexican Baseball League.

Toros de Tijuana
On July 10, 2018, Lake was traded to the Toros de Tijuana of the Mexican Baseball League. Lake did not play in a game in 2020 due to the cancellation of the Mexican League season because of the COVID-19 pandemic.

After the 2020 season, he played for the Dominican Republic in the 2021 Caribbean Series.  After each of the 2021 and 2022 seasons, Lake played for Estrellas Orientales of the Dominican Professional Baseball League.

References

External links

1990 births
Living people
Águilas Cibaeñas players
Arizona League Cubs players
Baltimore Orioles players
Bravos de León players
Buffalo Bisons (minor league) players
Chicago Cubs players
Daytona Cubs players
Dominican Republic expatriate baseball players in Canada
Dominican Republic expatriate baseball players in Mexico
Dominican Republic expatriate baseball players in the United States
Dominican Summer League Cubs players
Estrellas Orientales players
Iowa Cubs players

Major League Baseball outfielders
Major League Baseball players from the Dominican Republic
Mesa Solar Sox players
Mexican League baseball center fielders
Mexican League baseball right fielders
Norfolk Tides players
Sportspeople from San Pedro de Macorís
Peoria Chiefs players
Tennessee Smokies players
Toronto Blue Jays players
Toros de Tijuana players